Finney is an unincorporated community in King County, Texas, United States.
As of the 1990 Census, the population was estimated to be 70 residents.

History
Located in the fertile ranch and farmland of King County, Finney was named after neighboring Finney Springs. As with the rest of the communities in this sparsely populated county, Finney has never possessed a high number of residents; the most ever counted in the community was 100 during the 1960s. It was also during this time that the Finney School, built in 1912, was consolidated with Guthrie schools. By 1990 the population had fallen to 70 and there were no operating businesses.

Education
Finney is served by the Guthrie Common School District.

References
Handbook of Texas Online entry for Finney

Unincorporated communities in Texas
Unincorporated communities in King County, Texas